is a Japanese footballer who plays for Tokyo Verdy.

Club statistics
Updated to 23 February 2018.

References

External links

1987 births
Living people
Kokushikan University alumni
Association football people from Hiroshima Prefecture
Japanese footballers
J2 League players
J3 League players
Kataller Toyama players
Thespakusatsu Gunma players
FC Machida Zelvia players
Tokyo Verdy players
Association football goalkeepers